Sidney Friede (born 12 April 1998) is a former German professional footballer who played as a midfielder.

Club career
On 1 January 2020, Friede joined SV Wehen Wiesbaden on a deal for the rest of the season.

In July 2020, he signed with Fortuna Liga side DAC Dunajská Streda, managed by Bernd Storck. The side finished second in the 2020–21 season. Following the end of the season, he announced his retirement from professional football, due to a knee injury.

International career
He was part of the Germany U19 team which competed in the 2017 UEFA European Championship, in which he scored a penalty in a 3–0 win over Bulgaria U19.

References

External links

1998 births
Living people
Footballers from Berlin
Association football midfielders
German footballers
German expatriate footballers
Hertha BSC II players
Hertha BSC players
Royal Excel Mouscron players
SV Wehen Wiesbaden players
FC DAC 1904 Dunajská Streda players
2. Bundesliga players
Regionalliga players
Belgian Pro League players
Slovak Super Liga players
Expatriate footballers in Belgium
German expatriate sportspeople in Belgium
Expatriate footballers in Slovakia
German expatriate sportspeople in Slovakia
German people of Nigerian descent
SC Staaken players